Boško Vuksanović (4 January 1928 – 4 April 2011) was a Yugoslavian water polo player who competed in the 1952 Summer Olympics.

He was born in Kotor, Kingdom of Serbs, Croats and Slovenes (presently Montenegro). Vuksanović was part of the Yugoslav team which won the silver medal in the 1952 tournament. He played in six matches. Four years later he was a squad member of the Yugoslav Olympic team in the 1956 tournament but did not play in a match.

He died on 4 April 2011 in Belgrade, Serbia.

See also
 List of Olympic medalists in water polo (men)

References

External links
 

1928 births
2011 deaths
Yugoslav male water polo players
Olympic water polo players of Yugoslavia
Water polo players at the 1952 Summer Olympics
Water polo players at the 1956 Summer Olympics
Olympic silver medalists for Yugoslavia
Olympic medalists in water polo
Medalists at the 1952 Summer Olympics